The Masonic Temple in Salina, Kansas is a monumental Classical Revival-style building completed in 1927. It was listed on the National Register of Historic Places in 2000.

Overview
It was built of steel reinforced concrete, and clad in limestone and marble. It has deep foundations, with an exterior of carthage stone up to the second floor.

History
On March 2, 1895, the previous Masonic building, which was reportedly the finest in the state, had been destroyed by fire started by sparks blown by strong wind from the burning neighboring Ober building, and then was rebuilt that October. It was reportedly the biggest fire in Salina history to date, and was stopped at the temple's two-foot-thick firewall.

Construction of the second, and current, building broke ground in late 1920. It was planned to be enclosed by January 1, 1922 and entirely completed by 1923. It was to be one of the most modern, though not the largest, Masonic temples in the country. Schmidt's architectural design was checked by "two noted engineering companies", and other architects and builders periodically visited to give informal approval in passing. Construction was prepaid as it progressed, by the owner, with no insurance.

On July 11, 1921, with $400,000 of prepaid construction completed, two thirds of the structure collapsed with minutes' notice, prompting evacuation. Workers jumped from the fifth floor, down each floor. The Salina Daily Union reported, "The top of the dome of the dining room, which was the top of the fifth floor, dropped to the next floor, and carried it with other floors to the ground, and pulling with it columns, pillars, joist, and false frame work. It makes a frightful mess." It sounded like an earthquake across town. Due to the advanced notice, the workers attempted to reinforce the collapse but failed, so three were injured and none killed. The site suffered $300,000 worth of damage. Schmitt was telegraphed and traveled from Oklahoma City to assess the cause.

Schmitt was replaced by Isaac L. Zerbe of the firm Wilmarth & Zerbe, and "apparently the contractor freely consulted both plans in completing the construction".

On January 30, 1922, the two upper floors were destroyed by fire with damages of $100,000 to $165,000. The organization's paper records were rescued. Several stores located on the first floor suffered water damage, and the firefighters and utility wires were coated in ice from all the water. The cause was a major explosion from a gas leak, which was heard across town like thunder. The most "mourned" loss was the $15,000 pipe organ, installed in 1911, which was reportedly the best in Kansas with an "untold number of combinations and the most satisfactory tone". The disaster prompted discussion of the enlargement of the city fire department.

References

Clubhouses on the National Register of Historic Places in Kansas
Neoclassical architecture in Kansas
Masonic buildings completed in 1927
Buildings and structures in Saline County, Kansas
Masonic buildings in Kansas
National Register of Historic Places in Saline County, Kansas